In the 1938 FIFA World Cup qualification Group 5, the two teams played against each once on neutral ground. The winner Switzerland qualified for the third FIFA World Cup held in France.

Match

Switzerland vs Portugal

NOTE: João Cruz missed a penalty after 55 minutes.

Switzerland qualified.

Team stats

Head coach:  Karl Rappan

Head coach:  Cândido de Oliveira

References

External links
FIFA World Cup Official Site - 1938 World Cup Qualification

5
1937–38 in Portuguese football
qual